
Gleneagle can mean:

Australia 
Gleneagle, Queensland, a rural locality in the Scenic Rim Region
Gleneagle, Western Australia

Canada 
 Gleneagle Secondary School, a public high school in Coquitlam, British Columbia, Canada

United States 
 Gleneagle, Colorado
 A neighborhood in Arlington, Washington

See also 
 Gleneagles (disambiguation)